Cory Wong (born March 8, 1985) is a Grammy-nominated American guitarist, bassist, songwriter, podcast-host, and producer based in Minneapolis, Minnesota. He has released many works as a solo artist and in partnership with others. His background spans several genres including jazz, rock and funk. He has performed with Vulfpeck, Dave Koz, Stay Human, The Fearless Flyers, Ben Rector, Dr. Mambo's Combo, Chris Thile and Dirty Loops. He released several albums in 2020, including Live in Amsterdam, a collaboration with the Metropole Orkest, and Meditations, a new-age album with Jon Batiste. His recent works include two albums released in conjunction with his variety show.

Early life
Born in Poughkeepsie, New York, Wong was raised in Minneapolis, Minnesota, and is of mixed Chinese-American descent. Growing up, he was exposed to classic rock and jazz music by his father. He took piano lessons at age nine. He was fascinated by the Red Hot Chili Peppers and Primus and decided to play bass and start a band. He took guitar and bass lessons and started a punk rock band. His first instruments were a Fender Jazz Bass, a Gretsch guitar, and a Fender Stratocaster. He acquired a second Stratocaster during his senior year of high school, which remained his primary instrument until the release of his signature Fender Stratocaster in 2021.

Career

Wong attended University of Minnesota and the McNally Smith College of Music. At age 20 he decided to pursue music professionally. He credits his music school environment and his mentors for putting him on the right track. In particular he credits Peruvian guitarist Andrés Prado and Prince's drummer Michael Bland for showing him the nuances and cohesion of performing in an ensemble. He names guitarists Dave Williams and Paul Jackson Jr. as early influences.

In late 2000s and early 2010s, Wong focused on jazz music and performed in Minneapolis–Saint Paul jazz clubs. He released two records with jazz ensembles, Even Uneven in 2008 and Quartet/Quintet in 2012. He then performed in the Nashville music scene on a regular basis as a session musician and guitarist. He started touring with Ben Rector and worked with a variety of artists including Bryan White, Brandon Heath and Dave Barnes. In 2013, for a six-month period he performed in the Minneapolis-based band Dr. Mambo's Combo with several veterans of the city's R&B-pop-funk music scene including members of Prince's band: Michael Bland and bassist Sonny T. He calls this period his learning curve in performing "vibrant funk soul" music.

In 2013, Wong met members of the Ann Arbor-based band Vulfpeck. He did a jam with the group which was later rerecorded and released as "Cory Wong". In 2016, he started recording and touring with the band. He has recorded on every Vulfpeck album since then and toured with the band. He said of his guitar sound with Vulfpeck: "part of my sound is kind of bringing rhythm guitar to the front". He is a member of The Fearless Flyers, an instrumental quartet (with Vulfpeck's bass player Joe Dart, Snarky Puppy's guitarist Mark Lettieri and drummer Nate Smith) and has released three EPs and an album with the group.

In 2016, Wong released a six-track EP as a lead artist. In 2017, he released his debut solo album, Cory Wong and The Green Screen Band. His second solo album The Optimist was released in 2018 and reached number 19 on the U.S. Jazz Albums chart. He released a third album Motivational Music for the Syncopated Soul in 2019. The albums feature contributions by Phoebe Katis, Antwaun Stanley, Michael Bland, Sonny T., Ben Rector, Jon Batiste, Louis Cato, Nate Smith and others. In 2020, Wong released his fourth solo album, Elevator Music for an Elevated Mood, which he called a continuation of his third album.

Wong has performed with Dave Koz, Metropole Orkest, Stay Human (the house band of The Late Show with Stephen Colbert), and with Chris Thile's band on the radio program Live from Here. He has toured in the United States and Europe in support of his solo albums, and with Vulfpeck. He released several albums in 2020, including a Grammy nominated new-age album titled Meditations with Jon Batiste.

In 2020 to 2022, in the absence of touring over the coronavirus pandemic, Wong released multiple solo and collaborative albums including The Golden Hour with Dave Koz, Turbo with Dirty Loops, and Tailwinds with The Fearless Flyers. He hosted a music podcast for Premier Guitar magazine and he produced a YouTube music-comedy-variety show. In 2021, the Fender company released the Cory Wong signature model Stratocaster guitar which incorporates Wong's design preferences.

Variety show 

In 2021, Wong premiered a YouTube variety show titled "Cory and the Wongnotes". The show features a full ensemble band, original music, short comedy skits, and interviews on subjects such as gear, genre and rhythm. The band consists of Wong (guitar), Sonny T. (bass), Kevin Gastonguay (keys), Nêgah Santos (percussion), Petar Janjic (drums), Eddie Barbash (sax), Kenni Holmen (sax, flute), Sam Greenfield (sax, clarinet), Steve Strand (trumpet), Jon Lampley (trumpet), Michael Nelson (trombone, horn arrangement). The show featured collaborators Cody Fry and Antwaun Stanley and culminated in the release of an 11-track album.

The second season of the show premiered in April 2022 and includes guests Larry Carlton, Mark Lettieri, Nate Smith, Victor Wooten, Sierra Hull, Béla Fleck, Chromeo, Big Wild, Billy Strings, Lindsay Ell and Joey Dosik. A 15-track album titled Power Station was released in conjunction with the show.

Equipment

Wong's primary equipment includes the following, Guitar: Fender Highway One Stratocaster with Seymour Duncan Antiquity pickups, Amplifiers: Fender '65 Super Reverb reissue and Kemper Profiler, Strings: D'Addario NYXL (.010–.046), Accessories: Wampler Ego Compressor, Vertex Steel String Clean Drive, and Strymon Big Sky. He uses a variety of other instruments and accessories as well. He aims for a clean tone, and often records direct. In 2021, the Fender company released Wong's signature model Stratocaster guitar.

Discography

Solo studio albums
Quartet/Quintet (2012)
Cory Wong and The Green Screen Band (2017)
The Optimist (2018)
Motivational Music for the Syncopated Soul (2019)
Elevator Music for an Elevated Mood (2020)
Trail Songs : Dusk (2020)
Trail Songs (Dawn) (2020)
The Striped Album (2020)
Cory and The Wongnotes (2021)
Wong's Cafe (2022)
Power Station (2022)

Cory Wong Quartet
Even, Uneven (2008)

The Fearless Flyers 
The Fearless Flyers (2018)
The Fearless Flyers II (2019)
Tailwinds (2020)
The Fearless Flyers III (2022)

with Jon Batiste
Meditations (2020)

with Dave Koz
 The Golden Hour (2021)

with Dirty Loops
 Turbo (2021)

Awards and nominations

Notes

References

External links

Interview with Cory Wong, 2019, at Total Guitar magazine

American funk guitarists
Rhythm guitarists
American male guitarists
American session musicians
American musicians of Chinese descent
Songwriters from Minnesota
Guitarists from Minnesota
Musicians from Poughkeepsie, New York
21st-century American guitarists
21st-century American male musicians
Living people
21st-century American drummers
American funk drummers
Musicians from Minneapolis
American male songwriters
1985 births